Annfred is an unincorporated community in Kanawha County, West Virginia, United States.

The name Annfred is a portmanteau of Anna and Fred, honoring a railroad worker and his wife.

References 

Unincorporated communities in West Virginia
Unincorporated communities in Kanawha County, West Virginia